is the city-owned public corporation that handles Tokyo's water supply.

Activities 
Tap water supply: Production of drinking water with advanced water purification
Tap water supply for industrial use (water purification without disinfection)

See also
Tokyo Waterworks Historical Museum

External links 
Tokyo Metropolitan Government Bureau of Waterworks
Tokyo Sui
Advanced Information

Water supply and sanitation in Japan